American singer Josh Groban has released nine studio albums, four live albums, and 30 singles. Throughout his career, he has sold over 35 million records worldwide, making him one of the biggest stars in the history of classical crossover. Groban ranks as Billboard's 14th top-selling artist of the 2000s with more than 20 million units sold in the U.S. alone. According to RIAA, he has sold 20.5 million certified album units in the US while "Noel" is his biggest seller being certified 6× Platinum in the country and was also the best-selling album of 2007 with almost 3.7 million sold that year. He has scored 3 No. 1 albums on Billboard 200. Closer was the best-selling classical album of the 2000s decade. Groban is also the only artist who has had two albums appear on the Top 20 Best-Selling Albums list of the past decade, according to Billboard.

Albums

Studio albums

Live albums

Compilation albums

Singles

As main artist

As featured artist

Music videos

Videography

CD/DVDs
Josh Groban in Concert (2002)
Live at the Greek  (2004)
Up Close with Josh Groban (Mother's Day release, 2008)
Awake Live (2008)
Soundstage Presents: Josh Groban – An Evening in New York City (2009)
Stages Live (2016)
Bridges Live from Madison Square Garden (2019)

DVD releases with other artists
 Sarah Brightman: La Luna: Live in Concert (DVD) – 2001 – Duet on "There for Me"
 Enchantment (Charlotte Church) – 2001 – Duet on "The Prayer and “Somewhere"
 Prelude: The Best of Charlotte Church – 2002 – Duet on "The Prayer"
 Concert for World Children's Day (DVD) – 2002 – Performed "Gira Con Me," "To Where You Are," "The Prayer" (duet with Céline Dion), and "Aren't They All Our Children Anthem" as a cast.
 Hitman David Foster & Friends (DVD) – 2008 – Performed "Bridge Over Troubled Waters" With Bryan Mcknight.
 Chris Botti In Boston (DVD) – 2009 – Performed "Broken Vow".
 Chess in Concert (DVD) – 2009 – Performed "Where I Want to Be," "Quartet (Model of Decorum and Tranquility)," "Mountain Duet," "Anthem," "One More Opponent," "You and I," "The Interview," "Talking Chess," "Endgame," "You and I (Reprise)."

Songs featured on CD releases by or with other artists
 Charlotte Church – Enchantment – 2001 – "The Prayer" and "Somewhere"
 Barbara Cook – Barbara Cook at the Met – 2006 – "Not While I’m Around" and "Move On" performed live at the Metropolitan Opera.
 Hurricane Relief  – Come Together Now: "Alla Luce del Sole" and "Tears in Heaven" – 2005 – Participated in the fund raising concert and CD for victims of the hurricanes of 2005, including Katrina and Rita.
 Barbra Streisand – Duets – 2002 – "All I Know of Love"
 Angelique Kidjo – Djin Djin – 2007 – "Pearls" (also featuring Carlos Santana)
 Instant Karma: The Amnesty International Campaign to Save Darfur (The Complete Recordings) – "Imagine"
 David Foster – The Best of Me – 2002 – "The Prayer" with Charlotte Church
 Hit Man: David Foster and Friends – 2008 – Bridge Over Troubled Water (featuring Brian McKnight)
 Charles Aznavour – Duos – 2008 – "La Boheme" (duet), recorded in French and English versions
 Plácido Domingo – Amore Infinito – 2008 – "La tua semplicità" (duet)
 Chris Botti – Chris Botti In Boston – 2009 – "Broken Vow"
 Nelly Furtado – Mi Plan – 2009 – "Silencio"
 Joshua Bell – At Home With Friends – 2009 – "Cinema Paradiso"
 USA for Haiti – We Are the World 25 for Haiti – 2010 – Charity single
 Tony Bennett – Duets II – 2011 – "This Is All I Ask" (duet)
 Barbra Streisand – Partners – 2014 – "Somewhere" (duet)
Jennifer Nettles – Bridges – 2019 – "99 Years" (duet)

Soundtracks
 A.I. – Artificial Intelligence Original Motion Picture Score – 2001 – Duet on "For Always" (with Lara Fabian)
 Troy Soundtrack – 2004 – "Remember" with Tanja Tzarovska
 The Polar Express Soundtrack – 2004 – "Believe"
 Lady in the Water (teaser trailer) – 2006 – "Mi Mancherai (Il Postino)"
 Makete katsu/The Win After The Lose – NHK Japan mini-series theme song – 2012 – "KONOSAKI NO MICHI"
 Beauty and the Beast soundtrack – 2017 – "Evermore"
 Natasha, Pierre & the Great Comet of 1812 (Original Broadway Cast Recording) – 2017 – Principal soloist as Pierre Bezukhov
 Crazy Ex-Girlfriend season 3 soundtrack – 2018 – "The End of The Movie"

Frequent collaborators
Certain performers have appeared with frequency as part of Groban's band. These include:
 Tariqh Akoni: guitar and music director
 Lucia Micarelli: violin, concert mistress, and featured soloist
 Tim Curle: percussion

Notes

A  "To Where You Are" did not enter the Billboard Hot 100, but peaked at number 16 on the Bubbling Under Hot 100 Singles chart.
B  "O Holy Night" did not enter the Billboard Hot 100, but peaked at number 9 on the Bubbling Under Hot 100 Singles chart.
C  "Believe" did not enter the Billboard Hot 100, but peaked at number 12 on the Bubbling Under Hot 100 Singles chart.
D  "You Are Loved (Don't Give Up)" did not enter the Billboard Hot 100, but peaked at number 10 on the Bubbling Under Hot 100 Singles chart.
E  "The First Noël" did not enter the Billboard Hot 100, but peaked at number 23 on the Bubbling Under Hot 100 Singles chart.

References

Discographies of American artists
Pop music discographies
Josh Groban